= Category E =

Category E can refer to:

- Category E stations (DfT)
- Category E necrophiliacs, known as dabblers
- Category E Olympic sports
- Category E flight instructor (New Zealand)
